Sultan Hersi Aman was a Somali ruler. He was the 3rd Sultan of the Habr Yunis Sultanate.

Biography

Reign
Hersi Aman belonged to the  Bah Makahil section of the Sugulle dynasty. He succeeded his grandfather, Sultan Deria Sugulleh, and ruled from the mid to late 19th century. Hersi's father Aman Deria was an important Habr Yunis chieftain. Vesme Baudi travelling through Habr Je'lo country east of Burao in 1889 gives an account of Aman's tomb.

At nine o'clock we arrived at Baiadowal, on the Thug Dehr, a charming site, where the trees form a small forest, in which the most delightful coolness is enjoyed. A few hundred meters away there is a tomb surrounded by a palisade of tree trunks made with care. There rests a chieftain of the Habr Junis, by name Ohman-Dhirrin [Aman Deria]..his tribe had intermingled with the Habr Gialeh, and when that chief had died, they had made him that tomb with a palisade in memory of his great merits.

Hersi is remembered for his successful conquests and expansion of Garhajis territory in the Haud. His reign was abruptly ended when he was killed in a battle against the kindred Baha Sugulleh.

In the year 1873, Swiss explorer H.G Haggenmacher met Hersi during his travels through Somaliland and describes him as such:
 I received a visit from Hersi Aman, the most powerful chieftain of the Habar Yunis... Hersi Aman is a stout man, with piercing eyes, firm language and quick movements. He is a relative of Hersi Sultan and through personal courage has attained his current power

Battle with Kirh
German explorer Felix Rosen who visited British Somaliland and Ethiopian Empire in 1907 met and discussed with northern Somalis and was told about Hersi and other legendary figures who had died in the decades prior. One such story was the battle between Sultan Hersi & the famed warrior Kirh of the Rer Samatar subclan. Sultan Hersi's powerful section of Rer Ammaan had been raided by Kirh and his Rer Samatar. Given the fierce reputation of their target, Kirh's companions were uneasy and fled after the raid, leaving Kirh for dead. His wife began to mourn alongside his kinsmen but to everyone's surprise, Kirh had survived the wilderness and emerged with 100 camels he had captured. This feat impressed Hersi and there was no attempt to recover the lost stock.

Kirh recited a boastful gabay

O yalahe hoi, o yalahe hoi, yalahe
My, our lore of death has spread through all tribes near and far
And we felt so safe that we spurned the camels with the lance to prick our mark of possession
Let the animals move slowly so that the camel fillings do not become tired
At the time when the cowards among our companions took flight and the hiding places
Then the lion's mane grew around our shoulders
My wife! little was our Seriba; I have filled ten Serbs for you
Come, now fill the milk baskets; we have plundered the tribe of Amman

When fighting would eventually resume, Hersi called out inquiring where Kirh was in the heat of battle. In response, a spear flew and grazed the Sultan's head. Hersi grabbed the spear which Kirh had thrown and returned the favour piercing through Kirh's famed horse and embedding deep in Kirh. He would escape the battlefield despite the wound leaving Hersi and the Rer Ammaan victorious having killing one & capturing another man named Hashi.

Hersi now answered the previous gabay and mocked his opponent
<blockquote>
How Kirh first bragged so much - now his speeches are silent!
Once the Samatar tribe was large and rich, now it is small and become poor
Now their caravans are afraid, even a day's march from Amud to go so far!We killed one of their men, we caught one of them, and one we drove the lance through the bodyTell us, according to the truth, O Hashi! About which of the three you mourn the most that we like from your tribe?</blockquote>

Hashi having been challenged by the Sultan spoke
That you killed one of our men was by fate 
Predestined that you captured me does no harm
But no mother has ever given birth to a hero like Kirh

Hersi being moved by these words spared Hashi from the usual deadly fate of a captive instead giving him a fine horse and sent medicines & gifts with Hashi to deliver to Kirh. Kirh would return the favour finally reconciling the feud. 

Downfall

Hersi Aman's increasing grip and autocratic rule over the Habr Yunis had fermented some resentment amongst his direct subclan (Rer Sugule) and some stood to challenge him. The wise Guled Haji another prominent member and elder of the Rer Sugule had a fallout with Sultan Hersi and his son was killed by one of Hersis' sons. Hersi's son approached his father and implored him to pay the traditional mag compensation to Guled for the loss of his child. Hersi arrogantly rebuffed his son and all out conflict would break out between Ba Awal (Hersi's branch) and Baho Sugule branches of the Rer Sugule.

Fighting would continue and one of the Sultan's skilled men Warsame had slain 3 of the Baho Sugule and captured the young Jama Amume also known as 'Jama the Mute' a grandson of Sultan Deria Sugule who was from a different branch. Upon being spared, during the next clash Jama would mortally wound Warsame and recited this poem victoriously. In it he praises his horse 'Hamar' that performed well that day and speaks about Warsame. These poems were recorded by Luigi Robecchi Bricchetti in his 1885 book.

The Sultan Hersi himself would be killed in battle soon after and the sister of Warsame lamented for the loss of Hersi, Warsame and other relatives in this poem

One of the sons of the Sultan recited these lines looking to avenge their father

Following Hersi's death the Rer Sugule gathered and the issue of compensation for the Sultan's death was a pressing issue. The conflict originally starting because no compensation had been paid to Guled Haji for his son. They decided that none would be paid and they would try to put this conflict to rest.

Maxamed Bulxan's poem touches on the unique nature of the meeting

Despite this 2 year conflict culminating in Hersi's death it would not entirely end. Both Awad Deria and Nur Ahmed Aman were proclaimed Sultan by their respective branches (Baho Sugule) and (Ba Awal) with Sultan Nur eventually triumphing as the uncontested Sultan. During the period of division, the rival sultans would split Habr Yunis territory in two and the lucrative caravan routes to tax. Sultan Nur held the Jerato pass and Tuuyo plains and his rival Sultan Awad Deria secured Burao as his base until his death, with Sultan Nur ultimately taking it.British Somaliland by Drake Brockman, pp.79 - 82

In Poetry
Hersi Aman's was well remembered in tales about the powerful Sultan's downfall captured by both contemporary poets and some in the decades following his death. Salaan Carrabey in his poem Tolnimo Wa Dugsiye (Kinship is a Shelter) captures the conflict and how Hersi's ambition was the cause of so much devastation, 

Ismail Mire in his famous poem Ragow Kibirka Waa Lagu Kufaa'' (Pride Comes Before a Fall) comments on Hersi's conquests, pride and desire to rule

See also
Somali aristocratic and court titles
Garhajis
Guled Haji wise elder and rival of the Sultan
Sultan Deria Hassan contemporary of Hersi Aman and Grand Sultan of the Isaaq
Isaaq
Salaan Carrabey
Ismail Mire

References

Somali sultans
Somalian Muslims
19th-century Somalian people
Year of birth missing
1879 deaths